James Bernard Hockley (born 16 April 1979) is a former English professional cricketer who played for Kent County Cricket Club.

Born in Beckenham, Hockley made his first-class cricket debut in 1998 against Oxford University. Seen as a limited overs specialist, Hockley made 81 one-day appearances for the county. He was released at the end of the 2002 season.

Between 2002 and 2009, Hockley taught sports at Marlborough House School in Cranbrook, whilst continuing to play cricket for Hartley Country Club in the Kent Cricket League. His performances for Hartley prompted Kent to re-sign him ahead of the 2009 season and he played two more seasons for the county before returning to focus on teaching whilst still playing for Hartley.

References

External links

1979 births
Living people
English cricketers
Kent cricketers
Kent Cricket Board cricketers